The women's +67 kg competition in taekwondo at the 2022 Mediterranean Games was held on 4 July at the Mohammed ben Ahmed CCO in Oran.

Results
 Legend
 PTG — Won by Points Gap
 SUP — Won by superiority
 OT — Won on over time (Golden Point)
 DQ — Won by disqualification
 PUN — Won by punitive declaration
 WD — Won by withdrawal

References

W+67
Mediterranean Games - Women's 68 kg